The Maranatha Living Hope Academy, commonly known as Maranatha or simply MLHA, is a private non-sectarian school located at Barangay Malusak, Santa Rosa City, Laguna, Philippines.

See also
 Department of Education (Philippines)

References

High schools in Laguna (province)
Schools in Santa Rosa, Laguna
Educational institutions established in 1990
1990 establishments in the Philippines